Dal Pescatore is a restaurant in Canneto sull'Oglio, Italy, south of the city of Mantua. The chefs are Nadia Santini, Giovanni Santini, and Bruna Santini. 

The restaurant was voted 48th best in the world in the Restaurant Top Fifty of 2009. It also has three Michelin stars.

The restaurant is notable for its tortelli stuffed with pumpkin, amaretto, Parmesan, and mostarda.

See also
 List of Michelin starred restaurants

References

External links

Restaurant review by Oliver Thring

Restaurants in Italy
Michelin Guide starred restaurants in Italy